is a fighting video game for the PlayStation 3 and Xbox 360 based on the anime Dragon Ball Z. The game was developed by Dimps and published in North America and Australia by Atari, and in Japan and Europe by Namco Bandai under the Bandai label. It was released in Japan on June 5, 2008, in Europe on June 6, 2008, North America on June 10, 2008, and in Australia on July 3, 2008.

The game allows the player the opportunity to let their character battle other characters controlled by the in game AI, or another player both on or offline depending on the mode of play the player or players choose. The game's Z Chronicles story mode allows players the chance to relive key points of the three sagas within the Dragon Ball story with the aid of items called Drama Pieces that give what has been called an immense Dragon Ball experience. The game became a top rated title for the PlayStation 3 and was nominated for a Spike Video Game Award for best fighting game.

Gameplay 
 The game's combat presentation is displayed in a 3D format. Players take control and battle one of the characters from the Dragon Ball franchise. Players are also given the ability to partner with another character within the game, in a vein similar to that of the Shin Budokai series. However, unlike those games, assisting characters do not fight, but instead provide various bonuses during the battle.

Another attack ability is Aura Spark mode; in this mode players can utilize stronger attacks, but this will eventually drain the player's ki gauge. Unlike previous Dragon Ball fighting games, players are not given the ability to build their ki. Instead, the gauge refills over time.

Taking the place of Skill Capsules are items called Drama Pieces. These appear in the form of in-game cut scenes that can affect the gameplay and overall outcome of the battle, such as the character receiving a Senzu Bean from their partner for health, the character's defense or attack raised, or their partner jumping in to defend. Drama Pieces can only be activated when certain achievements are met.

One of the game's main modes of play is the "Z Chronicles" which allows the player the opportunity to relive key points from the "Saiyan" saga to the "Cell Games" arc. There are also two exclusive stories within this mode. The first where Bardock defeats Frieza and finds himself mysteriously on present day Earth, and the second where Broly journeys to Earth in search of Goku. Another game mode is the Trial mode, where players are given the option of three types of challenges: the Survival Mode, where players must fight a wave of opponents for as long as their health last, the Time Attack Mode, where the player must defeat opponents before a certain amount of time runs out, and the Battle Points Mode, where players must earn battle points in battle.

The game features an online mode where players battle other players locally or internationally, and also post their high scores from the different game modes.

Development 
The game was first announced in the December 2007 issue of V Jump magazine. It was stated that the game would utilize 2-D fighting mechanics, the cut scenes would affect the overall gameplay and that it would be released for both the PlayStation 3 and Xbox 360 games consoles the following year in Japan. The January issue of V Jump featured information regarding some of the game's battle mechanics and battle rules. On January 16, Atari issued a press release announcing that they would be distributing the game throughout North America and that they would retain the Burst Limit title. The February issue of V Jump revealed that the game's story mode would extend into at least the Cell saga. Later that month, an early demo of the game was presented at the 2008 Game Developers Conference. It was revealed that the game would feature both the English and Japanese voice cast and that it would be expected to be released sometime in the third quarter. A spread in the March issue of V Jump revealed that the game would feature at least thirty-five playable characters and thirteen battle stages. With some of the featured stages being the Cell arena, the unstable Namek, and Earth's orbit. It would also reveal the cover art and Japanese release date for June 6. Another spread in the April issue of V Jump discussed more on the battle systems and visuals. In May, a playable demo of the game was released on Xbox Live Marketplace and PlayStation Network. On June 10, Atari issued another announcement stating that they had shipped copies of the game to retailers throughout North America. Later that month, the game was unveiled at New York Comic Con for a hands-on demonstration.

According to producer Yasuhiro Nishimura, the game is not a fighting game, but simply "A Dragon Ball Z game". The idea was not to make a game that would be another licensed cash in, but a game that could be held with as much prestige as the manga and anime. As Nishimura went on record stating "We want this to be a new expression of Dragon Ball Z, not just an extension." Naoki Eguchi of Namco Bandai Europe stated that both the PS3 and Xbox 360 versions were produced simultaneously and that the gameplay was similar to Budokai 3 with new improvement integrated. He continued that they were very pleased with the shaders as they allowed "“High-end quality Anime-expressions” and let us create dramatic animations". He would point out, "We do not aim to be “realistic”, but to maintain a high quality “anime” style". Co-producer Yasu Nishimura stated that Shueisha had some involvement with ideas for the game development. The developers also wanted to put emphasis on character sizes. Small characters like Krillin and Kid Gohan move quickly, while larger characters like Broly move slower.

Characters

Soundtrack 

 is the official soundtrack to the video game. It was released by Lantis Records on August 27, 2008 in Japan only. The theme song "Kiseki no Honō yo Moeagare!" and its English counterpart "Fight it Out" were written by Yuriko Mori and Kanon Yamamoto (Canon) respectively, and performed by Jpop vocalist Hironobu Kageyama. It was believed that it would be accompanied by composition from the previous game Dragon Ball Z: Budokai Tenkaichi 3. As a result many online retailer to erroneously list this as the soundtrack of both games.

Track listing:
奇跡の炎よ　燃え上がれ!!(GAME OP size) Kiseki no Honō yo Moeagare!!/Flare Up Miraculous Fire!!
Sizzle Dizzle
Raging Evil
Festa de Morado
果てしなく赤い荒野Hateshinaku Akai Arano/Eternally Red Wasteland
May I help you?
キャプテン・スリルKyaputen Suriru/Captain Thrill
Unbreakable Mission
破壊～Heartbeat of Battle Fields～Hakai ~Heartbeat of Battle Fields~/Destruction ~Heartbeat of Battle Fields~
絶体絶命～DEAD HAND～Zettai Zetsumei ~DEAD HAND~/Desperate Situation ~Dead Hand~
青い嵐Aoi Arashi/Blue Storm
Let's Fight! Fight!
怒りを力に・・・ikari o chikara ni.../Anger Towards Power.... 
天空都市Tenkū Toshi/Sky City
Naughty Pilgrims
Kaffein
Smoky September
呪文Jumon/Incantation
ΦtiNg☆dAnCEFaitiNg☆dAnCE/Fighting Dance
Battleholic～孤高の狼～Battleholic ~Kokō no Ōkami~/Battleholic ~Superiority of the Wolf~
世界ノ果テニ笑ヒシ悪魔Sekai no Hate Teni emi Hishi Akuma/Devil Laughing at the End of the World
シュウエンShūen/Demise
呼び醒まされた闘志Yobi Samasa re ta Tōshi/The Awakened Fighting Spirit
最終血戦Saishū Kessen/Final Bloody Battle
運命Unmei/Fate
Fight it Out

Reception 

Following its initial release, the PS3 version became the top selling game in Japan for a total of three months. Beating out its Xbox 360 counterpart, which came in at twelve, and other games including Mario Kart Wii, which came at four, and Ninja Gaiden II, which came in at eight. Atari reported that the game along with Alone in the Dark helped to increase the company's net sales. The game was nominated for a Spike video game award for best fighting game, but lost out to Soul Calibur IV.

Along with its sales the game received positive reviews from various gaming critics. GameRankings and Metacritic gave it a score of 73% and 72 out of 100 for the Xbox 360 version, and 72% and 71 out of 100 for the PlayStation 3 version. Chris Roper of IGN felt that the combat mechanics were "simple and deep", but had issues with the extent to which many of the characters and stages were similar to each other. Will Herring of GamePro praised the games' visuals and felt that the Drama Pieces integrated well within the Z Chronicles. However, he stated that they didn't seem to work well when applied to the multiplayer mode. Justin Calvert of GameSpot stated the visuals and animation would impress regular gamers, despite referring to the environments as bland. He continued, saying that "the overall look of Burst Limit is definitely greater than the sum of its parts". Phil Theobald of GameSpy felt the lack of content made the X360 version of the game feel a little shallow, but called it a quality fighting game with an improved game engine that couldn't be denied. GameTrailers praised the same version by calling it "a well-rounded package in fighting shape", while keeping its paces with plenty of gaming modes. They also stated that its depth might not please hardcore gamers, but fans or gamers looking for a user friendly fighter might enjoy it. Dakota Grabowski of GameZone stated that the X360 version was an excellent game with some drawbacks, such as lack of characters and an under refined online multiplayer, but felt the game was a critical success. Matt Cabral of Official Xbox Magazine praised the controls and the visuals. He also stated "after countless titles spanning various platforms, we may just have the best Dragon Ball Z game yet".

However, some critics were not as pleased with the game overall. Anthony Gallegos of 1UP.com was impressed by the game at first but was ultimately disappointed by its lack of innovation. Dale Nardozzi of TeamXbox called much of the games features bare bones. He also complained about the game's sixty dollar price tag, stating that the gameplay didn't justify the game's cost. He recommended as that consumers would be better off getting the game as a trade-in, a rental, or as a loan from a DBZ fan.

During the days after the game's initial release, a few gaming critics managed to give some statement about the soundtrack. IGN gave the soundtrack a 7.5 stating the soundtrack was "strong, though not great". In their Burst Limit review Gamespot stated that "...the upbeat soundtrack is something of an acquired taste".

References

Notes

External links

 Official Site 
 

2008 video games
Video games developed in Japan
PlayStation 3 games
Xbox 360 games
Burst Limit
Fighting games
Video games with cel-shaded animation
Atari games
Dimps games
Bandai Namco games
Multiplayer and single-player video games
Video games scored by Kenji Yamamoto (composer, born 1958)